Lincoln East High School is a public high school located in Lincoln, Nebraska, United States. It is part of the Lincoln Public Schools district. The current principal is Casey Fries.

As of the 2014-15 school year, the school had an enrollment of 1,589 students and 102.1 classroom teachers (on an FTE basis), for a student–teacher ratio of 15.6:1. There were 194 students (12.2% of enrollment) eligible for free lunch and 70 (4.4% of students) eligible for reduced-cost lunch.

History 
Lincoln East High School opened in 1967 as the fourth high school in the Lincoln Public Schools system. A student vote resulted in the Spartan mascot and the school colors of blue and white, modeled after the flag of Greece.

Extracurricular activities

Athletics 
LEHS' boys basketball team won state championships in 1971,1978 and 2001. The girls' basketball team has four state championships. The boys' golf team has twelve state championships. The girls cross country team won the NSAA Class A championship in 2018. LEHS'boys tennis team won 10 state championships in 1998, 1989, 1990, 1991, 1992, 1993, 1994,1995, and 2007, and 2021. LEHS Boys soccer won state titles in 1996, 1997, 2002, 2005, 2006 and 2010. Jeff Hoham coached the most state titles in school history with a total of 16, in a combined 3 sports -boys tennis (88, 89, 90, 91, 92, 93, 04, 05 2007. He also coached state titles in -girls tennis in 88, 90, 91 and in boys soccer in -2002, 2005 2006, and 2010.

Forensics 
From 2002 to 2016, the Lincoln East speech team took first place each year at the annual state tournament. The team won 32 of the 45 state titles in speech since the tournament started and the 15 consecutive state championships are the most of any team in the state in any sport or activity.

Performing arts 
LEHS has three competitive show choirs, the mixed-gender Express and Elevation and the female-only Elegance. The school also hosts its own competition, the Spartan Spectacular.

We the People 
Lincoln East's We the People team won the Nebraska state championship in 2020 and 2022.

Notable alumni 
 Dan Brown, blogger
 Tosca Lee, author
 Bryan Odell, former music interviewer and YouTuber
 Brandon Sanderson, author
 Eric Stokes, NFL scout and executive
 Kent Wells, former NFL player
 Rob Zatechka, former NFL player
 Mike Zentic, former NFL player

References

External links
 Lincoln Public Schools
 Official Lincoln Public Schools Website

Public high schools in Nebraska
Schools in Lincoln, Nebraska
1967 establishments in Nebraska
Educational institutions established in 1967